The Athlete Refugee Team (ART) competed at the 2019 World Championships in Athletics in Doha, Qatar, from 27 September to 6 October 2019. It was represented by 6 athletes.

Results

Men

Track and road events

Women
Track and road events

References

Nations at the 2019 World Athletics Championships
Athlete Refugee Team at the World Athletics Championships